An antalgic gait is a gait that develops as a way to avoid pain while walking (antalgic = anti- + alge, "against pain"). It is a form of gait abnormality where the stance phase of gait is abnormally shortened relative to the swing phase. It is a good indication of weight-bearing pain.


Conditions associated with an antalgic gait
 Coxalgia
 Leg cramps
 Legg–Calvé–Perthes disease (LCPD)
 Osteoarthritis
 Pelvic girdle pain (PGP)
 Slipped capital femoral epiphysis
 Tarsal tunnel syndrome (TTS)
 Trauma

References

Gait abnormalities